Nazarov, or Nazarova (feminine; Назарова) is a Russian family name of Rurik stock. The surname derives from the given name Nazar (for Slavic peoples） or Nazarbay （for Turkic peoples）.

The surname may refer to:

Alexander Nazarov (1925–1945), Soviet army officer and Hero of the Soviet Union
Alexander I. Nazaroff, interpreter and literary critic
Anarkul Nazarov (b. 1950), Uzbek composer and conductor
Akmal Nazarov (born 1985), Uzbekistani actor
Anna Nazarova (b. 1986), Russian long jumper
Ardak Nazarov, Kazakhstani jiu-jutsu champion
Amo Bek-Nazarov (1892–1965), Soviet/Armenian actor, director, and playwright
Anatoly Mikahilovich Nazarov (1878–1918), Don Ataman, part of the White movement
Andrei Nazarov (b. 1965), Estonian athletics coach and retired decathlete
Andrei Nazarov (b. 1974), Russian professional ice hockey player
Daler Nazarov (b. 1959), Tajik composer, singer, and actor
Dimitrij Nazarov (b. 1990), Azerbaijani-German footballer
Dilshod Nazarov (b. 1980), Uzbek concertist-cellist, "Virtuosity Price" of III Int. Tchaîkovsky Competition
Dilshod Nazarov (b. 1982), Tajikistani athlete
Eduard Nazarov (1941–2016), Russian animator 
Fedor Nazarov (b. 1967), professor of mathematics in Michigan State University
Ivan Nazarov (1906–1957), Soviet chemist and academician
Karl Erik Nazarov (b. 1999), Estonian athlete, sprinter
Klavdiya Nazarova (1920–1942), Soviet Komsomol member and Hero of the Soviet Union
Lyudmyla Nazarova, Ukrainian mathematician
Natalia Nazarova — several people
Orzubek Nazarov (b. 1966), a Kyrgyz boxer
Paul Nazaroff (?–1942), Russian geologist and writer
Vyacheslav Nazarov (1952–1996), Soviet/American jazzman
Sergey Nazarov (b. 1989), Russian programmer and CEO of SmartContract.com
Murod Nazarov (b. 1980),  Vice-president of the polo federation of Uzbekistan

Other
Nazarov cyclization reaction, an organic reaction

Russian-language surnames